is a Japanese fashion model, actress, and singer. She is the daughter of film actor Ken Watanabe and his first wife Yumiko. In her modeling work, she is known by the mononym Anne.

Career
Watanabe's first high-profile modeling season was spring/summer 2007, in which she was featured in runway shows for Anna Sui, Diane von Furstenberg, Tommy Hilfiger, and Vivienne Tam, among others. She also walked for Baby Phat, Imitation of Christ, Karl Lagerfeld, Lacoste, Marc by Marc Jacobs, and Thakoon in subsequent seasons.

Watanabe has been featured in print advertisements for Anna Sui and NARS Cosmetics. She was the main visual model for Sui's Secret Wish Magic Romance fragrancefor both print and video.

Personal life
In Japan, Watanabe is also a well-known reki-jo (history girl) -- a female history otaku.

She can speak English and French to some extent.

She married actor Masahiro Higashide on 1 January 2015.

On 16 May 2016, Watanabe gave birth to twin daughters. On 7 November 2017, she gave birth to a son.

On 23 January 2020, Shūkan Bunshun revealed that Watanabe's husband had been having an extramarital affair with actress Erika Karata since 2017, when Watanabe was pregnant with their third child, which was later confirmed by Higashide's agency. On 1 August 2020, Watanabe finalized her divorce with Higashide, promising that they would work together to take care of the children.

Works

TV drama

Tengoku to Jigoku (TV Asahi, 2007)
Tenchijin (NHK, 2009), Megohime
Karei Naru Spy (NTV, 2009)
Samurai High School (NTV, 2009)
Shinzanmono (TBS, 2010, ep1)
Naka nai to Kimeta Hi (Fuji TV, 2010)
Joker: Yurusarezaru Sōsakan (Fuji TV, 2010)
Namae o Nakushita Megami (Fuji TV, 2011)
Yokai Ningen Bem (NTV, 2011)
Taira no Kiyomori (NHK, 2012), Hōjō Masako
xxxHOLiC (WOWOW, 2013)
Kasuka na Kanojo (Fuji TV, 2013)
Gochisōsan (NHK, 2013)
Hanasaki Mai Speaks Out (NTV, 2014–), Mai Hanasaki
Date - Koi to wa Donna Mono Kashira (Fuji TV, 2015)
Japan Sinks: People of Hope (2021), Minori Shiina

Film
Sakura no Sono (2008)
Fashion Week (2009)
Bandage (2010)
Ninja Kids!!! (2011), Shina Yamamoto
Yōkai Ningen Bem The Movie (2012)
Platinum Data (2013)
Midsummer's Equation (2013)
Miss Hokusai (2015), Oei (voice)
Lost and Found (2016)
Golden Orchestra! (2016)
Birthday Wonderland (2019), Chii (voice)
Cube (2021)
The Deer King (2022), Sae (voice)
Tombi: Father and Son (2022), Yumi
Tokyo MER: Mobile Emergency Room: The Movie (2023), Yū Kamoi
 Kingdom 3 (2023), Zhi Xia

Radio
Book Bar (2008–present, J-Wave)

Documentary
Asia's Great Ruins (Also known as "Ring of Civilization", 2015, NHK, as navigator)

Discography

Mini-albums
Lights (2010, Epic/Sony)
Ai o Anata ni (2012, Epic/Sony)

Recognitions
49th FECJ Awards: International Model of the Year
64th Television Drama Academy Awards: Best Supporting Actress for Naka nai to Kimeta Hi
56th Elan d'or Awards: Newcomer of the Year
5th Tokyo Drama Awards: Best Supporting Actress for Yōkai Ningen Bem
23rd Hashida Award: Newcomer of the Year
52nd Galaxy Award: Individual Award for Hanasaki Mai Speaks Out, Kuroha, and Date - Koi to wa Donna Mono Kashira

References

External links

Anne Watanabe profile at NYmag.com

1986 births
Living people
21st-century Japanese actresses
21st-century Japanese singers
21st-century Japanese women singers
Japanese female models
Japanese film actresses
Japanese women pop singers
Japanese television actresses
Japanese television personalities
Asadora lead actors
Sony Music Entertainment Japan artists